Anne Coesens (born 1966) is a Belgian actress. She studied at the Royal Conservatory of Brussels and the National Superior Conservatory of Dramatic Arts in Paris and works in theatre. She also appears in films – her credits include Illegal, Ma vie en rose, Private Lessons, Tomorrow We Move, and Diamant 13. She received the Magritte Award for Best Actress for Illegal which was her fourth film with Olivier Masset-Depasse.

Filmography
 1997 : Ma vie en rose 
 1997 : Alliance cherche doigt
 1998 : Pure Fiction
 2000 : Le Secret
 2003 : Quand tu descendras du ciel
 2003 : Tomorrow We Move
 2004 : L'ennemi naturel
 2006 : Cages
 2006 : Darling
 2008 : Private Lessons
 2008 : 9mm
 2009 : Diamant 13
 2010 : Illegal
 2012 : Little Lion
 2012 : Goodbye Morocco
 2014 : Not My Type
 2014 : Next Year
 2014 : All Cats Are Grey
 2015 : April and the Twisted World
 2015 : Jailbirds
 2017 : Above the Law
 2019: Never Grow Old
 2019: Mothers' Instinct

References

External links

1968 births
Living people
Belgian film actresses
Belgian stage actresses
Magritte Award winners
French National Academy of Dramatic Arts alumni
20th-century Belgian actresses
21st-century Belgian actresses